is a Japanese manga artist. She specialises in shōjo manga, the most famous being Kare Kano: His and Her Circumstances, which is set in Kanagawa.

Since finishing Kare Kano, she worked on the series Chotto Edo Made which appeared in LaLa from May 2008 through August 2011. She then  has started work on Hinoko, premiering in LaLa in March 2012.

Manga works
 (1993)
 (1994)
 (1994)
 (1995)
 (1996)
 (1996–2005)
 (1999)
 (2005)
 (2007)
 (2008-2011)
 (2012-2017)

References

External links
 
Animeland interview 

Women manga artists
Manga artists from Kanagawa Prefecture
1970 births
Living people
Japanese female comics artists
Female comics writers
20th-century Japanese women writers
21st-century Japanese women writers